Ratu Banuve Lalabalavu Tabakaucoro (born 4 September 1992 in Suva) is a Fijian sprinter who specializes in the 100 and 200 metres. He is the national record holder in the men's 100 m and 200 m for Fiji.

Biography 
Tabakaucoro attended Marist Brothers High School Sports Science Academy and graduated in 2013.

Tabakaucoro is the only athlete in the Pacific Games history to win gold in both the 100 metres and 200 metres in 3 consecutive Pacific Games in 2011, 2015 and 2019 games.

In the 2011 Coke Games, Tabakaucoro ran his personal best in the senior boys 100 and 200 metres finals on the 29 and 30 April; he also helped his school win the 4 x 100 metres relay.

Tabakaucoro also won gold in the 100 meter, 200 meter and 4 × 100 m Relay at the Pacific Games in Nouméa, New Caledonia in September at the 2011 Pacific Games.

In March 2015, Tabakaucoro competed in the Australian Athletics Championships in Brisbane where he finished 2nd in the 100m Final with a time of 10.26s breaking the national record of 10.34s set by Jone Delai back in 1995. He also set a new national record in the 200m of 20.63s.

Tabakaucoro will compete in the 100 m and 200 m at the 2022 Commonwealth Games in Birmingham, England.

Personal best

Achievements

1: Disqualified in the semifinal.

References

External links

1992 births
Living people
Fijian male sprinters
People educated at Marist Brothers High School, Fiji
Athletes (track and field) at the 2014 Commonwealth Games
Athletes (track and field) at the 2020 Summer Olympics
Olympic male sprinters
Olympic athletes of Fiji
Commonwealth Games competitors for Fiji
World Athletics Championships athletes for Fiji
Sportspeople from Suva
Athletes (track and field) at the 2022 Commonwealth Games